Gródczanki  is a village in the administrative district of Gmina Pietrowice Wielkie, within Racibórz County, Silesian Voivodeship, in southern Poland, close to the Czech border.

The village has a population of 230.

References

Villages in Racibórz County